A D battery (D cell or IEC R20) is a standardized size of a dry cell. A D cell is cylindrical with an electrical contact at each end; the positive end has a nub or bump. D cells are typically used in high current drain applications, such as in large flashlights, radio receivers, and transmitters, and other devices that require an extended running time. A D cell may be either rechargeable or non-rechargeable. Its terminal voltage and capacity depend upon its cell chemistry.

The National Carbon Company introduced the first D cell in 1898. Before smaller cells became more common, D cells were widely known as flashlight batteries. The U.S. military designation for this battery has been BA-30 since sometime before World War II. During World War II, it was designated the Type C battery by the U.S. Navy, leading to confusion with the smaller C cell battery (BA-42).

In 2007, D batteries accounted for 8% of alkaline primary battery sales (numerically) in the US. In 2008, Swiss purchases of D batteries amounted to 3.4% of primary and 1.4% of secondary (rechargeable) sales.

Dimensions and capacity 

D batteries have nominal diameter of 33.2 ± 1 millimeters (1.3 inches).
The overall length is 61.5 millimeters (2.42 inches).

Names

Common

Other 
 U2 / HP2 / SP2 UK
 Type 373 Russia
 MN/MX1300
 Mono
 Goliath
 BA-30 US WWII
 #1 China
 UM 1 JIS
 6135-99-464-1938 / 6135-99-109-9428 (NSN)
 Flashlight Battery / Torch Battery
 B006 (NiMH)
 Torcia Italy
 Góliátelem Hungary
 Pilão Gostoso Brazil
 Pila Grande Argentina
 Kalın Pil Turkey
 Monočlánek / "Buřt" Czech

Battery capacity 
A battery's capacity depends upon its cell chemistry and current draw. Duracell brand rates its alkaline D cell performance as approximately 20,000 mAh at 25 mA draw, but about 10,000 mAh at 500 mA draw. This effect is generally less pronounced in cells with NiMH chemistry and hardly at all with NiCd. Many commonly available size D rechargeable cells are actually sub-C cells in a D-sized holder.

See also 
 List of battery sizes
 Battery nomenclature

References

External links 

 Duracell D Size Battery Specification
 Energizer D Size Battery Specification for Alkaline Cell
 Brand Neutral Drawing Of NiCd D Battery Based On ANSI Specifications 
 Brand Neutral Drawing Of NiMH D Battery Based On ANSI Specifications 
 Brand Neutral Drawing Of Alkaline D Battery Based On ANSI Specifications

Battery shapes